Trisent Ltd is a UK software applications company launched in May 2016. Based in Fife, Scotland, the company is developing mobile phone apps based on its personal context management system (PCMS). There was a related company called Trisent Communications Ltd, founded in 2004 and acquired by Artilium plc in 2008 for £1.7 million. Both companies were founded by Dr Gordon Povey. 

For reference purposes the original entry for Trisent Communications Ltd is below:

"Trisent Communications Ltd is a UK technology company headquartered in Dunfermline near Edinburgh. Trisent specialize in location-based services technology for locating and tracking mobile phones, vehicles and valuable assets. Trisent's core location technology is called Tri-cell which operates on GSM and 3G cellular networks. The important aspect of Tri-cell is that standard mobile phone handsets are used and no equipment is installed in the network."

Management
 Dr. Gordon Povey - Chief Executive
 Beth Scott - Non-executive Director
 Mark Hogarth - Advisory Board
 Catherine Brown - Advisory Board
 Joe Tree - Advisory Board
 Sarah Lee - Advisory Board
 Michelle McWilliams - Advisory Board
 Prof Bill Buchanan - Technical Advisor
 Luke Harte - Technical Advisor

References

External links
 Official Website

Technology companies of the United Kingdom